Aristida behriana is a native Australian species of grass commonly known as bunch wire grass or brush wire grass. Its seeds have three long, radiating awns; it is a member of genus Aristida, grasses known commonly as three-awns. The species favours low fertility and well-drained soils. It is commonly found in mallee woodlands and plains, where it grows on sunny slopes. Superficially, the flower heads resemble those of the invasive weed African feather-grass (Pennisetum villosum). A. behriana is found in all mainland Australian States.

References

External links

 Description on Kew Gardens Grassbase

behriana
Flora of New South Wales
Flora of the Northern Territory
Flora of Queensland
Flora of South Australia
Flora of Victoria (Australia)
Taxa named by Ferdinand von Mueller